The Medical Journalists' Association (abbreviated MJA) is a professional association for medical journalists in the United Kingdom. It was established in 1967 and held its first meeting on 1 February of that year in Ye Olde Cheshire Cheese, a famous pub on Fleet Street in London. As of 2015, it had over 475 members, each of whom were medical writers, health writers, broadcasters, or editors. Every year, the MJA awards its Medical Journalists' Association Awards to recognize extraordinary examples of medical and health journalism. These awards are broken up across 17 categories, the most prestigious of which is the prize for "Outstanding Achievement". Occasionally, the association also honours specific distinguished individuals in the field of medical journalism with a Lifetime Achievement Award; past recipients have included Oliver Gillie, Claire Rayner, and Jonathan Miller.

References

External links

See also
Association of Health Care Journalists - similar nonprofit organization in United States
 - medical journalism in Germany

Organizations established in 1967
Organisations based in London
1967 establishments in England
Medical journalism
United Kingdom journalism organisations
Professional associations based in the United Kingdom